Characiaceae is a family of green algae in the order Sphaeropleales.

Genera
, AlgaeBase accepted the following genera:
Acrochasma Korshikov – 1 species
Actidesmium Reinsch – 2 species
Bicuspidellopsis Korshikov – 1 species
Characiella Schmidle – 1 species
Characiellopsis M.O.P.Iyengar – 2 species
Characium A. Braun – 51 species
Craniocystis – 1 species
Deuterocharacium Petrý – 2 species
Korshikoviella P.C.Silva – 5 species
Lambertia Korshikov – 1 species
Lanceola F.Hindák – 1 species
Marthea Pascher – 1 species
Pseudoschroederia Hegewald & Schnepf – 3 species

References

External links

Chlorophyceae families
Sphaeropleales